John Lie is professor of sociology at the University of California, Berkeley. His principal academic interests are social theory, political economy, social identity, and East Asia.

Early life and education
Lie was born in Seoul, South Korea. He grew up in Tokyo, Japan, and Honolulu, Hawaii. After graduating from Punahou School, he attended Harvard University (A.B., Social Studies; Ph.D., Sociology). He has held tenured appointments at the University of Illinois, Urbana-Champaign and the University of Michigan, as well as holding visiting appointments at Yonsei University, Keio University, Harvard University, and other institutions.

Career
Lie's "sociological imagination" trilogy explores the intersection of biography, history, and social structure by analyzing his Korean diasporic experience. The trilogy comprises Blue Dreams: Korean Americans and the Los Angeles Riots, Han Unbound: The Political Economy of South Korea, and Multiethnic Japan. These books have transformed our understanding of topics ranging from ethnic conflict and economic growth to the nature of contemporary Japanese society. The latest addition is "Zainichi (Koreans in Japan): Diasporic Nationalism and Postcolonial Identity". He is a widely cited and quoted authority on the Korean diaspora.

Perhaps his most important book to date is Modern Peoplehood. It seeks to advance a unified theory to make sense of race, nation, ethnicity, racism, and (peoplehood) identity. By advancing a general theory of race, ethnicity, and nation that avoids ethnocentrism and essentialism, his theory of "modern peoplehood" promises to advance the current impasse of social-scientific discussion on these topics.

Lie was Dean of International and Area Studies at Berkeley for five years. In that capacity, he has been at the forefront of globalizing the university.

In the 2010s, Lie has continued to publish books on a variety of topics, including K-pop, East Asian political economy, and Japan and the idea of sustainable society.

Bibliography

References

External links 
 
 International and Area Studies Dean's Office, University of California, Berkeley

Living people
South Korean emigrants to the United States
University of California, Berkeley College of Letters and Science faculty
Punahou School alumni
Harvard University alumni
People from Seoul
American sociologists
University of Michigan faculty
Year of birth missing (living people)